The interdimensional hypothesis is a proposal that unidentified flying object (UFO) sightings are the result of experiencing other "dimensions" that coexist separately alongside our own in contrast with either the extraterrestrial hypothesis that suggests UFO sightings are caused by visitations from outside the Earth or the psychosocial hypothesis that argues UFO sightings are best explained as psychological or social phenomenon.

The hypothesis has been advanced by UFO enthusiasts such as Meade Layne, John Keel, J. Allen Hynek, and Jacques Vallée.  Proponents of the interdimensional hypothesis argue that UFOs are a modern manifestation of a phenomenon that has occurred throughout recorded human history, which in prior ages were ascribed to mythological or supernatural creatures. 

Jeffrey J. Kripal, Chair in Philosophy and Religious Thought at Rice University, writes: "this interdimensional reading, long a staple of Spiritualism through the famous 'fourth dimension', would have a very long life within ufology and is still very much with us today".

History

In the 19th century, various spiritualists believed in "other dimensions". During the Summer of 1947, spiritualists adapted the "other dimensions" folklore to explain recent tales of "flying discs".

Background

In the late 19th century, the metaphysical term "planes" was popularized by H. P. Blavatsky, who propounded a complex cosmology consisting of seven "planes". The term aether ("ether") was adopted from Ancient Greek via Victorian physics that would later be discredited. The term "ether" was then incorporated into the writings of 19th-century occultists.

The "etheric plane"  and the "etheric body" were introduced into Theosophy by Charles Webster Leadbeater and Annie Besant to represent a hypothetical 'fourth plane', above the "planes" of solids, liquids, and gases.  The term "etheric" was later used by popular occult authors such as Alice Bailey, Rudolf Steiner, and numerous others.

Meade Layne and 'Ether Ships'

On July 4, 1947, occultist Meade Layne claimed that flying discs were "etheric".  Layne claimed to be in telepathic communication with "people in the saucers", arguing "it is possible for objects to pass from an etheric to a dense level of matter and will then appear to materialize. They then will return to an etheric conditions". Layne claimed that "These visitors are not excarnate humans but are human beings living in their own world. They come with good intent. They have some idea of experimenting with earth life." The prior year, it had been reported that Layne consulted a medium who relayed communications from a "space ship named Careeta" that came to Earth from 'an unidentified planet'.

According to one scholar, Layne coined the term "interdimensional hypostasis" to describe the sightings. Layne is regarded as the earliest proponent of the interdimensional hypothesis.

John Keel and 'Ultraterrestrials'
Although the extraterrestrial hypothesis has remained predominant, by the 1970s, the interdimensional hypothesis began to be embraced by some UFO enthusiasts. Paranormal author and UFO enthusiast John Keel recalled:

In his 1970 book UFOs: Operation Trojan Horse, Keel argued that a non-human or spiritual intelligence source has staged whole events over a long period of time in order to propagate and reinforce certain erroneous belief systems. For example, monsters, ghosts and demons, the fairy faith in Middle Europe, vampire legends, mystery airships in 1897, mystery aeroplanes of the 1930s, mystery helicopters, anomalous creature sightings, poltergeist phenomena, balls of light, and UFOs; Keel conjectured that ultimately all of these anomalies are a cover for the real phenomenon.  Keel used the term "ultraterrestrials" to describe UFO occupants he believed to be non-human entities capable of taking on whatever form they want.

Hynek and Vallée

J. Allen Hynek was an American astronomer who served as scientific advisor to the U.S. Air Force UFO studies: Project Sign, Project Grudge, and Project Blue Book.  Hynek pioneered the "Close Encounter" classification system;   Hynek had a cameo in Stephen Spielberg's film Close Encounters of the Third Kind.   Jacques Vallée, a student of Hynek's,  served as the inspiration for the French researcher portrayed by François Truffaut in the film.

In 1975's The Edge of Reality, Vallée and Hynek consider the possibility of what they call "interlocking universes":
VALEE:  What other wild hypotheses could we make?HYNEK: There could be other universe with different quantum rules or vibration rates if you want.  Our own space-time continuum could be a cross-section through a universe with many more dimensions.  ...  Think what a hard time you would have convincing an aborigine that right now, through this room, TV pictures are passing! Yet they're here. You have to have a transducer to see them -- namely a TV set. Well, in the same sense there may be interlocking universes right here!  We have this idea of space, we always think of another universe being someplace else. It may not. Maybe it's right here."

In his 'landmark' 1969 book Passport to Magonia:  On UFOS, Folkore and Parallel Worlds, Vallee argues for a "parallel universe co-existing with our own". 
The idea was reiterated in Vallée's subsequent writings.  Vallée's summarized his objection in his 1990 paper "Five Arguments Against the Extraterrestrial Origin of Unidentified Flying Objects":
 unexplained close encounters are far more numerous than required for any physical survey of the earth; 
 the humanoid body structure of the alleged "aliens" is not likely to have originated on another planet and is not biologically adapted to space travel; 
 the reported behavior in thousands of abduction reports contradicts the hypothesis of genetic or scientific experimentation on humans by an advanced race; 
 the extension of the phenomenon throughout recorded human history demonstrates that UFOs are not a contemporary phenomenon; and 
 the apparent ability of UFOs to manipulate space and time suggests radically different and richer alternatives.

References

Ufology
Multiverse
Pseudoscience
Extraterrestrial life
20th-century neologisms